Zsófia Kovács (born 6 April 2000) is a Hungarian artistic gymnast who competed at the 2016 and 2020 Olympic Games. She is the 2017 European all-around silver medalist, the 2020 European champion on uneven bars, as well as the 2020 and 2022 European champion on vault.

Early life
Kovács was born on 6 April 2000 in Dunaújváros. She started gymnastics at the age of six.

Senior career

2016
Kovács became age-eligible for senior competition  in 2016, and made her senior debut at the Austrian Team Open, where she won the all-around ahead of Giulia Steingruber and Barbora Mokošová. She then competed at the Doha World Challenge Cup, where she took the bronze medal on floor behind Steingruber and Diana Bulimar.

In April, Kovács competed at the Olympic Test Event in Rio de Janeiro, which served as a qualifier for the 2016 Summer Olympics. She finished fourteenth in the all-around, earning an individual berth for the Olympic Games. In the qualification round of the Olympic Games, Kovács placed 33rd in the all-around and did not advance to any finals. 

Following the Olympics, Kovács competed at the Szombathely World Challenge Cup, where she won the bronze medal on the uneven bars. She also competed at the Cottbus World Cup, where she won the gold medals on uneven bars and balance beam, and also picked up the bronze on vault.

Also in 2016, she performed in the German Gymnastics Bundesliga (premier league) for the team TZ DSHS Köln. On the second competition day, she showed the best all-around performance of all gymnasts.

2017
At the European Championships in Cluj-Napoca, she won a silver medal in the all-around behind Ellie Downie, becoming the first Hungarian woman to land on the podium since Adrienn Varga did so in 1998 when she won vault. During these championships, Kovacs also qualified to three individual finals where she finished sixth on vault, uneven bars and balance beam.

She also competed at the 2017 World Championships in Montreal, but did not make any finals.

2018
Kovács was forced to miss the 2018 European Championships due to an abdominal injury.

In September, she competed at the Szombathely World Challenge Cup, where she won the gold medal in the balance beam final. She went on to compete at the World Championships in Doha, where she qualified to the all-around final, finishing twentieth with a score of 51.765.

2019
In March, Kovács competed at the Stuttgart World Cup and placed ninth in the all-around. However, in April, she had to withdraw from the European Championships due to a foot injury. She returned to competition at the Koper World Challenge Cup in June, where she won the gold medals in the uneven bars and balance beam finals.

In September, Kovács competed at the Paris World Challenge Cup, where she took the bronze medal in the uneven bars final behind Mélanie de Jesus dos Santos and Anastasia Agafonova. In October, she competed at the World Championships in Stuttgart, where she placed 30th in the all-around during qualifications. Although she did not qualify to the all-around final, she earned an individual berth for the 2020 Summer Olympics.

2020
In December, Kovács competed at the rescheduled 2020 European Championships in Mersin, where the Hungarian team of Kovács, Csenge Bácskay, Dorina Böczögő, Mirtill Makovits, and Zója Székely won the bronze medal behind Ukraine and Romania. The Hungarian team's placement on the podium was the first time in European Championship history. She also became the vault and uneven bars champion with scores of 14.050 (the average score of 14.350 and 13.750) and 13.850 respectively.

2021
In April, Kovács competed on bars and beam at the European Championships, but did not reach the finals. At the Osijek World Challenge Cup in June, she took the silver medal on the uneven bars behind Nina Derwael. Later that month, she took the silver on the balance beam at the Doha World Cup behind Diana Varinska.

Kovács represented Hungary at the 2020 Summer Olympics in Tokyo, her second Olympic Games. In the qualification round, she qualified to the all-around final, and placed fourteenth on the uneven bars, making her the third reserve for the bars final. In the all-around final, she finished fourteenth with a score of 53.433.

Kovács then competed at the World Championships in Kitakyushu, but was limited to the uneven bars due to a 
leg injury. She qualified to the bars final, where she finished fifth.

2022

Kovács started her 2022 season at the Cairo World Cup, where she took the silver medal on the balance beam. In June, she competed at the Koper World Challenge Cup, winning three gold medals on vault, uneven bars and balance beam.

In August, Kovács competed at the European Championships in Munich, where she was considered to be one of the favorites to medal in the all-around. However, in the qualification round of the competition, which also determined the all-around results, she fell twice on the balance beam and also fell on her uneven bars dismount. Despite the falls, she managed to score 52.765, finishing ninth in the all-around. Additionally, she qualified to the vault final in first place as well as the floor final in seventh place, and helped Hungary qualify to the team final. Hungary finished seventh in the team final. In the vault final, Kovács won the gold medal ahead of Asia D'Amato and Aline Friess, taking her second European title on the event. In the floor final, she fell on her third tumbling pass and placed eighth.

Competitive History

References

External links
 
 
 
 

2000 births
Living people
Hungarian female artistic gymnasts
Gymnasts at the 2016 Summer Olympics
Olympic gymnasts of Hungary
European champions in gymnastics
Gymnasts at the 2020 Summer Olympics
People from Dunaújváros
21st-century Hungarian women